Abdul Gaffar Choudhury (12 December 1934 – 19 May 2022) was a Bangladeshi-born British writer, journalist, columnist, political analyst and poet. He wrote the lyrics to "Amar Bhaier Rokte Rangano", a widely celebrated song commemorating the Bengali Language Movement. He was awarded Bangla Academy Literary Award in 1967, Ekushey Padak in 1983, and Independence Day Award in 2009.

Early life and family
Choudhury was born on 12 December 1934, to an aristocratic Bengali Muslim family known as the Zamindars of Ulania in Mehendiganj, then located under the Backergunge District of the Bengal Province. His ancestor, Shaykh Muhammad Asad Ali, arrived migrated from Persia to Ayodhya, later settling in the Bengali city of Murshidabad. Ali's great great great grandson Muhammad Hanif served as a military commander under Shaista Khan, the Mughal governor of Bengal. He was noted to have contributed to the suppression of Arakanese and Portuguese pirates in the Bay of Bengal. Hanif then entered the greater Barisal region where he served as the Jamadar of the Sangram Fort in Govindapur and settled in the village of Tetulia, Hizla. The family were later endowed the title of Choudhury, and from his descendants, Muhammad Taqi migrated from the Tetulia Jamadar Bari to the village of Ulania. His son, Naya Raja, was Abdul Gaffar Chowdhury's great grandfather. Naya Raja and his two brothers, Hasan Raja and Kala Raja, became notable as traders of areca nut, salt and rice, and built strong relationships with the Marwari merchants of Calcutta during the Company Raj. The three brothers established the ports of Lalganj, Aliganj and Kaliganj, and with their amassed wealth, established the zamindari of Idilpur.

Choudhury's father, Wahed Reza Choudhury, son of Fazel Ali, was a landlord and freedom fighter. He was the president of Congress's Bakarganj branch and a member of the All-India Congress Working Committee. His father also served as secretary to Motilal Nehru and was imprisoned in the 1942 August Movement. Choudhury's mother was Zohra Khatun. Choudhury had three brothers and five sisters, Ali Reza Choudhury (Mehdi) his younger brother, Hossain Reja Choudhury his elder brother. His sisters' names are; Manik Bibi Choudhury, Laili Khatun Choudhury, Saleha Khatun Choudhury, Masuma Begum Choudhury and his younger sister Fazilatun Nesa Choudhury.

Education
He graduated from the University of Dhaka in 1959 and came to England on 5 October 1974.

Career
Before moving to the United Kingdom, Choudhury worked as a journalist in different national newspapers in Dhaka. During the 1971 Bangladeshi Liberation War, he worked for Joy Bangla, Jugantar and Anandabazar Patrika.

He is perhaps best known for writing the lyrics to "Amar Bhaier Rokte Rangano" which is recognised as the most influential song of Bengali Language Movement and was initially set to music by him. Later, however, Altaf Mahmud's composed music and adapted the song. It has been regarded by listeners of BBC Bengali Service as the third best song in Bengali.

In the UK, Choudhury founded the newspaper Notun Din. He had written 35 five books. He lived in London from where he regularly wrote columns in national Bangladeshi dailies, in Bengali newspapers of the Bangladeshi community and in a daily paper in Kolkata.

Some of his notable works are "Dan Pithe Shawkat", "Chandrodwiper Upakhyan", "Nam Na Jana Bhore", "Nil Jamuna", "Shesh Rajanir Chand", "Polashi Thekey Dhanmondi", "Bastobotar Nirikhey" and others.

Choudhury had produced a film on the assassination of Sheikh Mujibur Rahman called Polashi theke Dhanmondi. It was reported in 2008, that he was due to produce the film The Poet of Politics about the life of Sheikh Mujibur Rahman.

Awards

Choudhury has received numerous awards including Bangla Academy Literary Award in 1967, Ekushey Padak, UNESCO literary Award, Bangabandhu Award, Shanghati Lifetime Achievement Award in 2008, Sadhinota Padak in 2009. In the same year, The Daily Ittefaq honoured him with Manik Miah Padak. In 2014, he was awarded the PIB-Sohel Samad Memorial Award.

Choudhury was a freeman of the London Borough of Tower Hamlets.

Personal life

Choudhury came to the United Kingdom for the treatment of his wife and could not return to Bangladesh for 22 years after the assassination of Sheikh Mujibur Rahman. On 18 December 2012, Choudhury's wife Selima Choudhury died in London. They had one son and four daughters. Their son, Anupam, works for Reuters, and their four daughters are Tanima, Chinmoyee, Binita and Indira.

Death

Choudhury died at the age of 87 of a cardiac arrest at a hospital in London.

Works

References

External links

 

1934 births
2022 deaths
People from Barisal District
Dhaka College alumni
University of Dhaka alumni
Bangladeshi emigrants to England
Bangladeshi people of Iranian descent
British people of Bangladeshi descent
Naturalised citizens of the United Kingdom
Bangladeshi columnists
British columnists
British political scientists
British poets
Bangladeshi male poets
Bengali-language writers
British Asian writers
20th-century British writers
21st-century British writers
20th-century Bangladeshi male writers
Journalists from London
Recipients of Bangla Academy Award
Recipients of the Ekushey Padak
Recipients of the Independence Day Award